Roberto Levis (born 6 January 1941) is a Puerto Rican fencer. He competed in the individual épée event at the 1972 Summer Olympics.

References

1941 births
Living people
Puerto Rican male fencers
Olympic fencers of Puerto Rico
Fencers at the 1972 Summer Olympics